Wayward Son is a 1999 American drama film directed by Randall Harris and starring Harry Connick, Jr. and Pete Postlethwaite. The screenplay concerns justice and redemption in rural Georgia during the Great Depression.

Plot
A southern man, Jesse Banks Rhodes (Harry Connick, Jr.), is released from a prison work camp in Louisiana, 1936, after being wrongly imprisoned for eleven years. He heads back to Georgia, only to find that most people are keen to keep him down. He begins working for a plantation owner (Walton Goggins) and rents a shed from a farmer (Pete Postlethwaite) with two daughters (Patricia Clarkson and Vinessa Shaw). After witnessing the murder of a black worker at the hands of a drunken white racist boss, Jesse is forced to prove his innocence, so injustice will not happen again.

Cast 
Harry Connick, Jr. as Jesse Banks Rhodes
Pete Postlethwaite as Ben Alexander
Patricia Clarkson as Wesley
Vinessa Shaw as Cordelia
Walton Goggins
Afemo Omilami as Horace
David Pickens as Warden
John Bennes as Lawyer
Stacie Richards Dail as young crying woman
David de Vries
Michael Gaston as Edgar
Rodney L. James as George
Laura Sametz asMrs. Blessing
Ron Clinton Smith as Vernon
Haviland Stillwell as Lila
Judson Vaughn as station manager
Tim Ware asforeman

Settings
Production of the film began Oct. 26, 1998 in Nashville. The movie was filmed at various locations in Georgia including Mansfield and the Southeastern Railway Museum.

Trivia
Wayward Son has in October, 2006, a number of screenings at the Heartland Film Festival.
As research for his role as Jesse Banks Rhodes, Connick spent two days in solitary at the Louisiana State Penitentiary Angola, even wearing leg irons and handcuffs during his stay.
Wayward Son was first called Letters From a Wayward Son.
Patricia Clarkson and Vinessa Shaw's roles as Wesley and Cordelia, had reportedly been designated for Embeth Davidtz and Tara Reid.
Screened at the Toronto International Film Festival in September 1999.
Produced by: Cary Brokaw/Avenue Pictures Productions, Maccabee Productions, Steve Tisch Company
International rights will be licensed by Arthur Kananack & Associates (AKA Movies).
This movie was delisted at $0 on April 29, 2002 since the stock was wrapped, but had no distribution.
Letters From A Wayward Son, Wayward Son Productions 1998: Budget $4.5 million.
An interview where the director Randall Harris discusses the film with Harry Connick Jr., including a few clips from the movie are featured at the Film-Fest: Issue 3 - Toronto DVD.
Animal Actors supplied talent on horseback, horses, mules, rattlesnakes, bloodhounds, and German shepherds.

Awards and nominations
Crystal Heart Award 1999, to producer Cary Brokaw. At the Heartland Film Festival.

References

External links

Wayward Son interview with Harry Connick Jr, 1998
Wayward Son premiere, photos
Filming at the Southeastern Railway Museum, photos

1999 films
1999 drama films
1990s English-language films
Films scored by James Newton Howard
Films scored by Steve Porcaro
American drama films
1990s American films